

Dressage
 March 21, 2013 – March 23, 2014: 2013–14 FEI World Cup Dressage
 2013–14 Western European League winner:  Tinne Vilhelmson-Silfvén
 2013–14 Central European League winner:  Tatiana Dorofeeva
 2013–14 North American League winner:  Lars Petersen
 2013–14 Asia / Pacific League winner:  Mary Hanna
 April 17 – 21: 2014 Reem Acra FEI World Cup Final at  Lyon
 Winner of both the Grand Prix and Grand Prix Freestyle:  Charlotte Dujardin (with horse Valego)

Show jumping
 March 27, 2013 – March 23, 2014: 2013–14 FEI World Cup Jumping
 2013–14 Western European League winner:  Marcus Ehning
 2013–14 Arab League winner:  Abdelkebir Ouaddar
 2013–14 Australian League winner:  Jamie Kermond
 2013–14 Caucasian League winner:  Jamal Rahimov
 2013–14 Central America and Caribbean Islands League winner:  Manuel Espinosa Pla
 2013–14 Central Asian League winner:  Umid Kamilov
 2013–14 Chinese League winner:  Liu Tongyan
 2013–14 Japan League winner:  Tae Sato
 2013–14 New Zealand League winner:  Samantha McIntosh
 2013–14 North America East Coast League winner:  Kent Farrington
 2013–14 North America West Coast League winner:  Nayel Nassar
 2013–14 South African League winner:  Jeanne Engela
 2013–14 South American North League winner:  Juan Manuel Gallego
 2013–14 South American South League winner:  Yuri Mansur Guerios
 2013–14 South East Asian League winner:  Kurniadi Katompo
 April 17 – 21: 2014 Longines FEI World Cup Jumping Final at  Lyon
 Winner:  Daniel Deusser (with horse Cornet d'Amour)
 April 24 – November 15: The 2014 Longines Global Champions Tour
 April 24 – 27 at  Antwerp
 Class 05: Antwerp 2014 CSI5* 1.60m (main GCT event) winner:  McLain Ward (with horse Rothchild)
 May 2 – 4 at  Madrid
 Class 10: Madrid 2014 CSI5* 1.60m (main GCT event) winner:  Maikel van der Vleuten (with horse VDL Groep Verdi)
 May 29 – June 1 at  Hamburg
 Class 06: Hamburg 2014 CSI5* 1.60m (main GCT event) winner:  Katrin Eckermann (with horse Firth of Lorne)
 June 6 – 8 at  Shanghai
 Class 04: Shanghai 2014 CSI5* 1.60m (main GCT event) winner:  Pieter Devos (with horse Dream of India Greenfield)
 June 12 – 14 at  Cannes
 Class 14: Cannes 2014 CSI5* 1.60m (main GCT event) winner:  Scott Brash (with horse Hello Sanctos)
 June 26 – 28 at 
 Class 05: Monaco CSI5* 1.60m (main GCT event) winner:  Bassem Hassan Mohammed (with horse Victoria)
 July 4 – 6 at  Paris
 Class 11: Paris 2014 CSI5* 1.60m (main GCT event) winner:  Kevin Staut (with horse Silvana*HDC)
 July 10 – 12 at  Cascais, Estoril
 Class 04: Cascais 2014 CSI5* 1.60m (main GCT event) winner:  Scott Brash (with horse Hello Sanctos)
 July 25 – 27 at  Chantilly, Oise
 Class 04: Chantilly 2014 CSI5* 1.60m (main GCT event) winner:  Rolf-Göran Bengtsson (with horse Casall Ask)
 August 1 – 3 at  Valkenswaard
 Class 04: Valkenswaard 2014 CSI5* 1.60m (main GCT event) winner:  Christian Ahlmann (with horse Codex One)
 August 14 – 16 at  London
 Class 14: London 2014 - CSI5* - 1.60 m (main GCT event) winner:  Scott Brash (with horse Hello Sanctos)
 September 12 – 14 at  Lausanne
 Class 10: Lausanne 2014 CSI5* 1.60m (main GCT event) winner:  Ludger Beerbaum (with horse Chaman)
 September 18 – 21 at  Vienna
 Class 04: Vienna 2014 CSI5* 1.60m (main GCT event) winner:  Marcus Ehning (with horse Plot Blue)
 November 13 – 15 at  Doha (final)
 Class 05: Doha 2014 CSI5* 1.60m (main GCT event) winner:  Rolf-Göran Bengtsson (with horse Casall Ask)
 Overall winner of the 2014 LGCT:  Scott Brash (with horse Hello Sanctos)
 June 4 – September 14: The Spruce Meadows Tournaments in  Calgary
 June 4 – 8: The "National"
 Biggest purse: The C$400,000 Royal Bank of Canada (RBC) Grand Prix Presented by Rolex event.
 Winner:  Jaime Azcarraga (with horse Anton)
 June 12 – 15: The "Continental"
 Biggest purse: The C$210,000 CP Grand Prix event.
 Winner:  McLain Ward (with horse Rothchild)
 June 26 – 29: The "Canada One"
 Biggest purse: The C$125,000 Imperial Challenge event.
 Winner:  Nicolas Pizzaro Suarez (with horse Colasko)
 July 2 – 6: The "North American"
 Biggest purse: The C$210,000 Cenovus Energy Classic (Derby) event.
 Winner:  Angel Karolyi (with horse Indiana 127)
 July 10 – 13: The "Pan American"
 Biggest purse: The C$400,000 Pan American Cup Presented by Rolex event.
 Winner:  Kent Farrington (with horse Uceko)
 September 10 – 14: The "Masters"
 FEI C$300,000 BMO Nations' Cup -> Champions: ; Second: ; Third: 
 C$1.5 million CP International winner:  Ian Millar (with horse Dixson)

Thoroughbred horse racing
Triple Crown (US)
 May 3: 2014 Kentucky Derby
 Winner:  California Chrome (horse);  Victor Espinoza (jockey); Art Sherman (trainer)
 May 17: 2014 Preakness Stakes
 Winner:  California Chrome (horse);  Victor Espinoza (jockey); Art Sherman (trainer)
 June 7: 2014 Belmont Stakes
 Winner:  Tonalist (horse);  Joel Rosario (jockey);  Christophe Clement (trainer)

Triple Crown (Canada)
 July 6: Queen's Plate
 Winner: Lexie Lou (horse);  Patrick Husbands (jockey); Mark Casse (trainer)
 July 29: Prince of Wales Stakes
 Winner: Coltimus Prime (horse);  Eurico Rosa da Silva (jockey); Justin J. Nixon (trainer)
 August 17: Breeders' Stakes
 Winner: Ami's Holiday (horse); Luis Contreras (jockey);  Josie Carroll (trainer)

English Triple Crown (UK)
 May 3: 2,000 Guineas Stakes
 Winner:  Night of Thunder (horse);  Kieren Fallon (jockey);  Richard Hannon, Jr. (trainer)
 June 7: 2014 Epsom Derby
 Winner:  Australia (horse);  Joseph O'Brien (jockey);  Aidan O'Brien (trainer)
 September 13: St. Leger Stakes
 Winner:  Kingston Hill (horse);  Andrea Atzeni (jockey);  Roger Varian (trainer)

Australian Triple Crown
 March 15: Randwick Guineas
 Winner: Dissident (horse);  Jim Cassidy (jockey); Peter Moody (trainer)
 March 29: Rosehill Guineas
 Winner: Criterion (horse); Hugh Bowman (jockey); David Payne (trainer)
 April 12: Australian Derby
 Winner: Criterion (horse); Hugh Bowman (jockey); David Payne (trainer)

Other equine events
 August 19 – 24: 2014 Summer Youth Olympics
 Team Jumping:  Europe;  South America;  North America
 Individual Jumping:   Emily Fraser;   Martina Campi;   Jake Hunter
 August 23 – September 7: 2014 FEI World Equestrian Games at the  Normandy region, centered around the city of Caen
  won the gold medal tally. The  won the overall medal tally.
 October 31 – November 2: FEI South American Championships 2014 in  Barretos
 Open Individual Eventing winner:  Henrique Plombon Pinheiro 
 Open Team Eventing winners:  (Henrique Plombon Pinheiro, Serguei Fofanoff, André Paro, Márcio Jorge)

References

External links
 International Federation for Equestrian Sports – FEI – official website
 Inside FEI Website

 
Equestrian by year